Paul Owens is a former professional rugby league footballer who played in the 1990s. He played at representative level for Ireland and (British Amateur Rugby League Association) England Lions, and at club level for Dudley Hill ARLFC (in Bradford).

International honours
Owens won 3 caps for Ireland in 1995 while at Dudley Hill.

References

Ireland national rugby league team players
Living people
Place of birth missing (living people)
Bradford Dudley Hill players
Year of birth missing (living people)